DYEZ (684 AM) Aksyon Radyo is a radio station owned and operated by Manila Broadcasting Company. Its studio is located at the Penthouse, Wilrose Bldg., Locsin St. cor. Burgos St., Bacolod, while its transmitter is located in Brgy. Taloc, Bago, Negros Occidental.

Broadcasting history
DYEZ was established in 1969 in the administrative building of the then Elizalde-owned Central Azucarera De La Carlota in La Carlota. It initially carried the call sign of DYEN. The station hosted some of the pioneer broadcasters in the province.

In 1972, it was among the stations that closed down upon the declaration of Martial Law. Several years later, it resumed operations as DYEZ and became the dominant news and music station. This was known at that time as DYEZ Sunshine City, the localized version of Manila's DWIZ (now owned by Aliw Broadcasting Corporation) used at that time as Sunshine City.

By the 1980s, DYEZ shifted its programming to full-time news and public affairs. With it came the change of name from Radyo Balita to Radyo Owang, until finally adopting the Aksyon Radyo branding in the late 1990s.

Aksyon Radyo Bacolod celebrated its 42nd Anniversary by way of a free medical and dental mission which benefitted nearly 300 patients.

Recently, Aksyon Radyo Bacolod capped the year 2011 with another project by its civic arm "Operation Tulong Task Force" when it turned over to the Social Action Center of the Diocese of Bacolod more than 200 boxes of used clothes and food stuff for the victims of Tropical Storm “Sendong".

In 2019, Aksyon Radyo Bacolod celebrated its 50th Golden Anniversary.

Recognitions and awards
 Kapisanan ng mga Brodkaster ng Pilipinas (2017) 25th KBP Golden Dove Awards BEST AM STATION-Provincial
 Kapisanan ng mga Brodkasters sa Pilipinas Golden Dove Nominee (2013) for best variety program for radio - provincial category for "Aksyon Jamboree"
 Kapisanan ng mga Brodkasters sa Pilipinas Golden Dove Nominee (2013) for Best Public Affairs Program-provincial category for its Year End Report Radio Documentary "Sa Tuig sang Kalayo"
 Kapisanan ng mga Brodkasters sa Pilipinas Golden Dove Awardee (2013) for Best AM Station Provincial Category
 Kapisanan ng mga Brodkasters sa Pilipinas Golden Dove Nominee (2012) for best AM station provincial category
 Kapisanan ng mga Brodkasters sa Pilipinas Golden Dove Nominee (2011) for best AM station provincial category
 Kapisanan ng mga Brodkasters sa Pilipinas Golden Dove Nominee (2011) for Best Public Affairs Program-provincial category for its Year End Report Radio Documentary "Crossroads"
 Golden Dove Awardee (2006) – best public affairs program – “Aksyon Hotline - anchored by Station Manager JJ Deocampo"
 Golden Dove Awardee (2004) “Puerti Nga Abiliti”, for best radio comedy.

References

Radio stations in Bacolod
Radio stations established in 1969
News and talk radio stations in the Philippines